Cameron Waters (born 3 August 1994) is an Australian motor racing driver who competes in the Repco Supercars Championship. He currently drives the No. 6 Ford Mustang GT for Tickford Racing. He is the cousin of Australian Superbike champion Josh Waters and currently holds the record for the youngest driver to compete in the Bathurst 1000, after winning the Shannons Supercar Showdown reality TV show in 2011. Cameron Waters won the 2015 V8 Supercar Dunlop Series with Prodrive Racing Australia in a Ford FG Falcon.

Career
Waters started his racing career in go-karts in 2001. After competing nationally and winning multiple state championships, Waters moved into open wheelers.  Starting in Formula Vee in 2009 before progressing to the Australian Formula Ford Championship in 2010. He claimed podium finishes in three races and finished sixth in the championship standings, which earned him the Rookie of the Year title. Waters went on to win the championship the following season, taking seven race wins. Waters drove for Kelly Racing in the V8 Supercar Development Series at Sandown at the end of the 2011 season and continued on with the team's new initiative, Dreamtime Racing, in the 2012 season before the team was withdrawn for financial reasons.

Also in 2011, Waters won the Shannons Supercar Showdown, a reality TV program run by Kelly Racing where ten drivers are given the opportunity to compete for a drive in the Bathurst 1000. Waters beat British driver Andrew Jordan in the final episode to win the drive alongside Grant Denyer. The pair failed to finish the race, however, after Waters hit the wall at Forrests Elbow and damaged the car. Waters returned to the Bathurst 1000 in 2012 to drive with Jesse Dixon, the winner of the 2012 edition of the Shannons Supercar Showdown, after Denyer injured his shoulder prior to the race. Waters and Dixon were the youngest driver combination in the race's history and finished in a respectable 20th position.

In the 2013 Dunlop V8 Supercar Series, Waters drove for Minda Motorsport in a VE Commodore, finishing in tenth position in the Championship.

He again drove at Bathurst in 2014 alongside Jack Perkins and claimed a twelfth-place finish. That same year he finished runner-up in the Dunlop Series. In 2015 it was announced he would join Prodrive Racing Australia for the V8 Supercar Enduro Cup and compete for the team in the Dunlop Series. Waters was runner up with Chaz Mostert at the Sandown 500 in a one-two finish for Prodrive Racing Australia. At the Bathurst 1000, Mostert had a massive crash and the car was unable to be repaired, forcing the team to withdraw the entry from the race. Waters replaced Mostert at the Gold Coast, New Zealand and Phillip Island events while Mostert recovered from injuries sustained in the Bathurst crash. Waters was crowned winner of the 2015 V8 Supercars Dunlop Series at Sydney Olympic Park, beating reigning champion Paul Dumbrell.

It was announced in early March 2016 that Waters would race full-time in the 2016 V8 Supercars Championship with Prodrive Racing Australia driving the No. 6 Ford FG X Falcon, with Mostert moving to the No. 55 Rod Nash Racing customer car.

Career results

Supercars Championship results

Complete Bathurst 1000 results

Complete Bathurst 12 Hour results

References

External links
Driver Database profile
Racing Reference profile

1994 births
Australian racing drivers
Australian Formula 3 Championship drivers
Formula Ford drivers
Living people
Supercars Championship drivers
V8SuperTourer drivers
Mercedes-AMG Motorsport drivers
Kelly Racing drivers
Strakka Racing drivers